Mauro may refer to:

Given name
 Mauro (footballer, born 1932), Brazilian footballer
 Mauro Silva (footballer, born 1978), Brazilian footballer
 Mauro (footballer, born 1984), Portuguese footballer
 Bruno Mauro (born 1973), Angolan footballer
 Fra Mauro (15th century), Venetian monk and mapmaker
 Mauro Barella (born 1956), Italian pole vaulter
 Mauro Blanco (born 1965), Bolivian footballer
 Mauro Camoranesi (born 1976), Italian football manager and former player
 Mauro Díaz (born 1991), Argentine footballer
 Mauro Esposito (born 1979), Italian footballer
 Mauro Eustáquio (born 1993), Canadian soccer player
 Mauro Giuliani (1781–1829), Italian guitarist and composer
 Mauro Hamza, fencing coach
 Mauro Icardi (born 1993), Argentine footballer
 Mauro Pagani (born 1946), Italian musician
 Mauro Pawlowski (born 1971), Belgian musician
 Mauro Prosperi (born 1955), Italian police officer and pentathlete 
 Mauro Ramos (1930–2002), Brazilian footballer
 Mauro Ranallo (born 1969), Canadian sports announcer
 Mauro Rosales (born 1981), Argentine footballer
 Mauro Scoccimarro (1895–1972), Italian economist and politician
 Mauro Scocco (born 1962), Swedish musician
 Mauro Silva (born 1968), Brazilian footballer
 Mauro Zárate (born 1987), Argentine footballer
 Mauro De Groeve (born 2003), Belgian video editor

Other uses
 Mauro (surname)
 Mauro (winery), a winery of The Golden Mile in Spain
 A favela (slum) in São Paulo, Brazil

See also
 San Mauro (disambiguation)
 Maura (disambiguation)
 Maurus (disambiguation)

Italian masculine given names
Spanish masculine given names